Richard Corey "Big Hoss" Harrison (born April 27, 1983) is an American businessman and reality television personality, known as a cast member of the History TV series Pawn Stars, which documents his work at the World Famous Gold & Silver Pawn Shop in Las Vegas, which he co-owns with his father, Rick Harrison.

Early life
Richard Corey Harrison was born on April 27, 1983, the son of Kim and Rick Harrison,<ref>{{cite book|author=Harrison, Rick|date=2011|title=License to Pawn: Deals, Steals, and My Life at the Gold & Silver|publisher=Hyperion|location=New York|ISBN=978-1-4013-2430-8|page=27-42}}</ref> and the grandson of Richard Benjamin Harrison, the co-owners of the World Famous Gold & Silver Pawn Shop in Las Vegas. He has two brothers, Adam Harrison and Jake Harrison.

Career
Harrison, who is known by the nickname "Big Hoss", began working at the shop at the age of nine.Meet the Pawn Stars: Corey "Big Boss" Harrison , History.com, accessed February 10, 2011. He eventually became the manager of the shop's day-to-day operations and 30 of its employees. He made the most purchases of anyone in the shop, and is being groomed by Rick to inherit the shop one day. Plots of Pawn Stars often feature Harrison coming into conflict with his father and grandfather over his knowledge of the shop's inventory, his responsibilities as a manager, and his overall judgment in sales, in particular his purchase of expensive items. In Season 7, Harrison tells his father and grandfather that he will take a job at another business if he is not given a 10% partnership in the shop. He remains with the shop after he is given a raise and a 5% partnership, with the possibility of a greater stake in the business in the future. Harrison appeared as himself, alongside his dad Rick and Chumlee in "iLost My Head in Vegas", the November 3, 2012, episode of the American TV series iCarly''.

Personal life
Harrison's first wife was his high school sweetheart, Charlene, whom he married in 2009. They divorced in 2015. On May 26, 2017, Harrison married his second wife, Korina "Kiki" Harrison. Their divorce was finalized in September 2018. Harrison cited as the reason for the divorce their competitive work schedules, though the end of their marriage was an amicable one. In October 2018, their son, Richard Benjamin Harrison, was born.

References

External links 

 

1983 births
Living people
Place of birth missing (living people)
Participants in American reality television series
Businesspeople from Las Vegas
Pawn Stars